Josephus Daniels (1862–1948), American Secretary of the Navy during World War I
Randy Daniels (born 1950), American Secretary of State of New York from 2001 to 2005
Jonathan Worth Daniels (April 26, 1902 - November 6, 1981), American White House Press Secretary